The C16 is an untarred road in the ǁKaras Region of southern Namibia. It starts in Keetmanshoop and leads via Aroab ( away) to the Klein Menasse border post with South Africa. The border post on the South African side is Rietfontein. In the raining season the C16 regularly deteriorates and becomes passable only with 4x4.

References

Roads in Namibia
ǁKaras Region